John Hoblyn (ca. 1660 – June 1706) was an English lawyer and Member of Parliament. He was the eldest son of Edward Hoblyn and Bridget Carew. He was called to the bar at Middle Temple in 1682, and was Town Clerk of Bodmin from 1692. In 1695 he was elected to Parliament as Member for Bodmin, and retained the seat unopposed until his death. In the House of Commons he generally voted with the Tories.

Some sources erroneously state that the banker Sir John Houblon was elected three times as MP for Bodmin, apparently confusing him with Hoblyn.

Marriage
He was married to Jane Symons in 1682 at Christ Church Greyfriars Newgate, London. They didn't have any children. In his will dated 1705, he left his property to his wife and to his brother Thomas. He also left property to his nephew Edward, which included The Barton of Colquite, the manor of Colquite and its mills and lands in St Mabyn, Egloshayle and Bodmin (except Pitt in St Mabyn).

References
 
 David W Hayton, Stuart Handley and Eveline Cruickshanks, The History of Parliament: the House of Commons 1690-1715 (Cambridge: Cambridge University Press, 2002)
 Robert Walcott, English Politics in the Early Eighteenth Century (Oxford: Oxford University Press, 1956)

1660s births
1706 deaths
Year of birth uncertain
Members of the pre-1707 English Parliament for constituencies in Cornwall
Tory MPs (pre-1834)
Members of the Middle Temple
English MPs 1695–1698
English MPs 1698–1700
English MPs 1701
English MPs 1701–1702
English MPs 1702–1705
English MPs 1705–1707
John